The Vodacom Journalist of the Year Awards are annual South African awards for journalism in a number of categories, awarded by Vodacom.

References

External links
 

South African awards